Caprodon is a small genus of fish belonging to the subfamily Anthiinae. It contains three species.

Taxonomy
Caprodon was first established by Coenraad Jacob Temminck and Hermann Schlegel in 1843 based on the type species Anthias schlegelii. It is classified under the subfamily Anthiadinae of the family Serranidae.

Description
The genus Caprodon can be distinguished from Odontanthias and other Anthiinae with teeth on the tongue, by the asymmetrical pectoral fins, the truncate caudal fin, the presence of a scaly dorsal sheath, and by the many-rayed soft dorsal fin.

Species
FishBase recognizes five species of Caprodon:

Caprodon affinis Tanaka, 1924
Caprodon krasyukovae Kharin, 1983 (Krasyukova's perch)
Caprodon longimanus (Günther, 1859) (Pink maomao)
Caprodon schlegelii (Günther, 1859) (Sunrise perch)
Caprodon unicolor Katayama, 1975 (Elegant anthias)

References

Anthiinae
Marine fish genera
Perciformes genera
Taxa named by Hermann Schlegel
Taxa named by Coenraad Jacob Temminck